Eyd or EYD may refer to:

Chah-e Eyd, a village in Iran
Ejaan Yang Disempurnakan, the Enhanced Indonesian Spelling System
Eurovision Young Dancers, a dance competition

See also
Eid (disambiguation)